Thomas Bain (1834–1915) was a Canadian politician.

Thomas Bain may also refer to:

Thomas Charles John Bain (1830–1893), South African road engineer
Thomas Bain (Orange) (born 1964), British-born Indian dean

See also
Thomas Baines (disambiguation)